Stop Motion is the debut EP by Japanese J-pop singer and songwriter Maki Ohguro. It was released on 24 June 1992 under EMI Music Japan. Album includes her debut single which has the same title as album, "Stop Motion'". The album reached No. 58 rank first week and charted for two weeks and selling a 9,000 copies.

Track listing

References

1992 debut EPs
Maki Ohguro albums
Being Inc. albums
Japanese-language EPs
Albums produced by Daiko Nagato